Mathias Møller Nielsen (born 19 March 1994 in Gentofte) is a Danish amateur road and track cyclist. He helped his Danish squad claim a gold medal in the men's junior team pursuit at the 2012 European Track Cycling Championships in Anadia, Portugal, and later represented his nation Denmark at the Summer Olympics in London. At the peak of his early sporting career, Nielsen currently rides for the Blue Water Cycling Team and Team Trefor-Blue Water.

Nielsen qualified for the Danish squad in the men's team pursuit at the 2012 Summer Olympics in London based on the nation's selection process from the UCI Track World Rankings. He and his teammates Michael Mørkøv, Rasmus Quaade, and Casper von Folsach surpassed the Spaniards by a short distance gap for a fifth-place finish in their final match at 4:02.671.

Career highlights

2011
 National Junior Track Championships, Ballerup
2nd Team pursuit
3rd Madison
 9th National Junior Time Trial Championships
2012
  European Under-23 Track Championships (Team pursuit), Anadia (POR)
  UCI World Cup (Team pursuit), Glasgow (GBR)
 2nd National Junior Track Championships (Team pursuit), Ballerup
2013
 1st  Overall, Tour of Berlin U23, Berlin (GER)
 1st Stage 1, Tour of Slovakia, Košice (SVK)

References

External links
Denmark Olympic Team Profile 
NBC Olympics Profile

1994 births
Living people
Danish male cyclists
Danish track cyclists
Cyclists at the 2012 Summer Olympics
Olympic cyclists of Denmark
People from Gentofte Municipality
Sportspeople from the Capital Region of Denmark